Richard Gane Wright (1 January 1877 – 27 October 1942) was an English first-class cricketer and educator.

The son of Richard Wright senior and his wife, Anne Maria Jones, Wright was born on New Year's Day in 1877 at Gisburn, Yorkshire. He later went up to Queens' College at the University of Cambridge, graduating in 1902. He played minor counties cricket for Hertfordshire from 1896–98, making six appearances in the Minor Counties Championship. He served in the Indian Education Service in British India, where he was the assistant principle of Aitchison College in Lahore. While in India, Wright made a single appearance in first-class cricket for the Europeans against the Muslims at Lahore in 1923. Batting once in the match, he was dismissed for 18 runs in the Europeans first-innings by Saleh Mohammad. He had married Gladwys Chaning-Pearce at Colombo in 1910; however she died at Lahore in 1918. The following year he married her sister, Rosella Lois Chaning-Pearce. Wright died in October 1942, at Cookham, Berkshire.

References

External links

1877 births
1942 deaths
People from Ribble Valley (district)
Alumni of Queens' College, Cambridge
English cricketers
Hertfordshire cricketers
Indian Education Service officers
Europeans cricketers